Kaupang was a Norse term for market-place composed of kaup- (buy) and angr (fjord, harbor), hence "buy fjord" or "buy harbor" (similar to the literal translation of Copenhagen). Today, it is generally used as a name of the first town-like market-place in Norway,  the Kaupang in Skiringssal, which is located in Tjølling near Larvik in Vestfold. Kaupang was an important merchant and craft center during the  Viking period and as yet the first known Norwegian trading outpost.

At Kaupang lie remains of one of Scandinavia’s earliest urban sites, established in year 800 A.D. Kaupang was abandoned in the mid-10th century.

It has been described as Norway’s most important monument from the Viking Age.

History

Kaupang was founded in the 780s and abandoned for unknown reasons in the early 10th century. It was situated on a beach by Viksfjord in Larvik municipality. Documentary sources indicate that the area was an important royal seat in the 8th and 9th centuries.

There is a general perception that Kaupang is mentioned under the name of Skiringssal (Old Norse: Skíringssalr) in Ohthere of Hålogaland's account of his travels. But the name of the port Ohthere visited at the end of the 9th century is only recorded as "Sciringes heal" in Old English, and there is no scientific evidence that "Sciringes heal" corresponded to Kaupang in Skiringssal.

Excavation
 
Archaeological evidence indicates that the site might have been the first proto-urban settlement of some significance in Norway. The excavations which have been conducted at Kaupang have found evidence for a handicraft and commercial center, with around 1,000 inhabitants. The settlement had diverse craft production and extensive trade with foreign countries. Commodities traded included iron, soapstone and perhaps fish.

In 1867 Nicolay Nicolaysen conducted the first excavations of the area, mapping one of the grave-fields around the settlement and excavating 79 grave mounds. He also uncovered a cremation cemetery, largely dated to the 10th century. Charlotte Blindheim started excavating in 1947 and completed her last publication in 1999, and Dagfinn Skre and his associates undertook a new program of work at Kaupang in 1997.

In the summer of 2000 the Institute for Archaeology, Conservation and Historical Studies at the University of Oslo began a new excavation program at Kaupang, under the direction of Dagfinn Skre, which ran until 2002, and a smaller excavation was conducted in Kaupang's harbour area in 2003. In total, four possible houses were uncovered, as were a number of hearths, pits and postholes. Following the excavations, scholars worked on analysing both artefacts and environmental samples from the excavations.

The results from the post-excavation work has been published in a series of three books, the first of which became available in 2007, the last being published in 2011. Many of the approximately 100,000 finds from excavations have been on display at the University of Oslo, including Arab silver coins, gold coin from Dorestad, hundreds of glass beads, jewelry of gold and bronze, pottery, weapons and tools.

See also
Kjøpstad
Köping
Købstad
Copenhagen
Kaupanger

References

Other sources
 Blindheim,  Charlotte Kaupang: Vikingenes handelsplass (Mortensen. 1972)
 Helle, K. et al., Norsk Byhistorie (Pax forlag, Oslo 2006) .
 Skre, Dagfinn; Stylegar Frans-Arne, Kaupang the Viking town (Jac Trykk as, Oslo 2008) .
Skre, Dagfinn (editor) Kaupang in Skiringssal  (Kaupang Excavation Projekt Publication. 2007)

External links
 Kaupang Excavation Project
Kaupang Exhibition

Villages in Vestfold og Telemark
Archaeological sites in Norway
Larvik
Former populated places in Norway